Claudio Ignacio Zamorano Salamanca (born 25 August 1998) is a Chilean footballer who plays for Deportes Temuco.

References

1998 births
Living people
Chilean footballers
Chilean Primera División players
Deportes Temuco footballers
Association football midfielders